The First International Dada Fair took place in Berlin in 1920. It was Grosz, Heartfield and Hausmann. It was to become the most famous of all Berlin Dada's exploits. It featured almost 200 works by artists including Hans Arp, Max Ernst, Hannah Höch, Francis Picabia, and Rudolf Schlichter, as well as key works by Grosz, Höch and Hausmann. The work Tatlin At Home, 1920, can be clearly seen in one of the publicity photos taken by a professional photographer; the exhibition, whilst financially unsuccessful, gained prominent exposure in Amsterdam, Milan, Rome and Boston. The exhibition also proved to be one of the main influences on the content and layout of Entartete Kunst, the show of degenerate art put on by the Nazis in 1937, with key slogans such as "Nehmen Sie DADA Ernst", "Take Dada Seriously!", appearing in both exhibitions.

References

1920 in Germany
Dada